Supriyo  Supriya Chakraborty  Abhay Dang  Union of India  Its Secretary, Ministry of Law and Justice  other connected cases (2023) are currently being argued before Supreme Court of India that considers marriage equality for same-sex couples. A 5-judge Constitution Bench will hear 20 connected cases from 52 petitioners. The Union Government under the Bharatiya Janata Party leadership opposed recognising same-sex marriage.

Case Summary

The Petition 
The petitioners requested the Supreme Court to
 Recognise the marriage between any two persons, regardless of gender identity and sexual orientation, under the following marriage laws, by enforcing the fundamental rights guaranteed under Articles 14, 15, 19, 21 and 25 of the Indian Constitution:
 Special Marriage Act of 1954
 Hindu Marriage Act of 1955
 Foreign Marriage Act of 1969
 Declare the notice and objection provisions of the Special Marriage Act and Foreign Marriage Act as void, by enforcing the fundamental rights guaranteed under Articles 14, 15, 19 and 21 of the Indian Constitution.
 Declare that a same-sex spouse of foreign-origin of an Indian Citizen or Overseas Citizen of India is entitled to apply for registration as an Overseas Citizen of India under the Citizenship Act of 1955.

The Response 
The respondent, Union Government under the Bharatiya Janata Party leadership opposed recognising same-sex marriage because
 Non-recognition of same-sex marriage does not violate the fundamental rights guaranteed under Articles 14, 15, 19, 21 and 25 of the Indian Constitution.
 Legislative intent, limiting the legal recognition of marriage and benefits associated with such legal recognition, cannot be subjected to judicial review.
 The State has legitimate interests in protecting historical, religious, and societal norms.

The Judgement 
The judgement is pending in this case.

Case Background 
The petitioners, Supriya Chakraborty and Abhay Dang have been in a romantic relationship since December 2012. During the COVID-19 pandemic, they fell severely ill, and the experience of the frailty of life motivated the petitioners to hold a wedding ceremony on 17th December 2021. Despite a decade-long committed relationship and wedding ceremony, the petitioners were still strangers in the eyes of the law. Understanding the importance of legal recognition of their marriage, the petitioners filed the petition with Supreme Court on 14th November 2022.

The Supreme Court bench consisting of Chief Justice DY Chandrachud and Justices PS Narasimha and JB Pardiwala directed high courts to transfer nine similar petitions— eight from Delhi High Court and one from Kerala High Court— to the Supreme Court to consider alongside the original petitioners.

The petitioners—Utkarsh Saxena, Ananya Kotia, Nitin Karani, Thomas Joseph, Akkai Padmashali, Vyjayanti Vasanta Mogli and Umesh P— challenged the notice and objection provisions of the Special Marriage Act and Foreign Marriage Act which hurt vulnerable minorities.The petitioners drew attention to the Law Commission Report which recommends the removal of the notice and objection provisions of the secular marriage laws to prevent “high-handed or unwarranted interference” in marriages.

Most of the petitioners wanted recognition of same-sex marriage under secular marriage law—Special Marriage Act and Foreign Marriage Act. The petitioners—Abhijit Iyer Mitra, Gopi Shankar M, Giti Thadani, G.Oorvasi, Nibedita Dutta, Pooja Srivastava, Sameer Samudra and Amit Gokhale— are practising Hindus, and they believe that Hinduism does not prohibit same-sex marriage. They argued that excluding same-sex marriage from the Hindu Marriage Act amounted to a violation of their freedom to practice their religion.

Many advocates represented the petitioners, while Attorney General R. Venkataramani and Solicitor General Tushar Mehta represent the respondents. The Supreme Court appointed Advocate Arundhati Katju and Kanu Agrawal as the Nodal Counsel for the petitioners and respondents, respectively.

Written Arguments

The Petitioners 
This section contains a summary of relevant precedents, issues and laws submitted by the petitioners over time.

Fundamental Rights 
The petitioners argued that the exclusion of same-sex couples from marriage laws constituted a violation of fundamental rights. Similarly, the notice and objection provisions in secular marriage laws— Special Marriage Act and Foreign Marriage Act— constitute a violation. Hence, following Article 32 of the Indian Constitution, which guarantees the Right to Constitutional Remedies and designates the Supreme Court as the protector of Fundamental Rights, the petitioners argued that they are within their rights to approach the Supreme Court.

In the cases of Sakal Papers (P) Ltd. v.  (1962), Bennett Coleman and Co. v.  (1972) and Maneka Gandhi v.  (1978), the Supreme Court, assessing whether a law infringes a fundamental right, held that it is not the intention of the lawmaker that is determinative, but whether the effect or operation of the law infringes fundamental rights. Since the marriage laws infringe on the fundamental rights of queer people, petitioners argued that the Supreme Court could act as the designated protector of fundamental rights. Petitioners highlighted the instances where the Indian Courts struck down the aspects of family law that violated the Indian Constitution— Mary Roy v. State of Kerala (1986), Githa Hariharan v. Reserve Bank of India (1999), Shayara Bano v.  (2017) and Arun Kumar v. Inspector General of Registration (2019).

Petitioners called attention to the ruling of National Legal Services Authority v.  (2014) and Navtej Singh Johar v.  (2018), where Supreme Court read Yogyakarta Principles into the Indian Constitution, which includes the right to marry and establish a family, regardless of gender identity and sexual orientation.

Right to Equality 
Along with the relevant precedents, Article 14 of the Indian Constitution guarantees equality before the law or equal protection of the laws within the territory of India for people of all sexual orientations and gender identities. While ruling on the case of  v.  (2014), Justice K.S. Puttaswamy (Retd.) v.  (2017) and Navtej Singh Johar v.  (2018), the Supreme Court declared that any law that fails to protect one’s self-determination of gender identity and sexual orientation is irrational and manifestly arbitrary, hence a violation of Article 14.

The petitioners highlighted that the notice and objection provisions apply only to the marriage solemnised under the secular marriage laws and not personal laws. The provision creates an unequal burden for those who choose to marry under personal laws and those constrained to marry under secular marriage laws. This classification is unreasonable and arbitrary and violates Article 14.

Protection from Discrimination 
Article 15 of the Indian Constitution and the relevant precedents prohibit discrimination on grounds only of gender identity and sexual orientation. While deciding the cases of  v.  (2014) and Navtej Singh Johar v.  (2018), the Supreme Court extended the protection offered by Article 15 to include gender identity and sexual orientation.

The notice and objection provisions of secular marriage laws discriminate those who are constrained to marry under secular marriage laws from those who marry under personal laws. Hence, the provision violates Article 15.

Right to Freedom 
Along with the relevant precedents, Article 19 of the Indian Constitution guarantees the right to choose a marital partner. According to the Supreme Court ruling in the cases of Vikas Yadav v. State of Uttar Pradesh (2016) and Asha Ranjan v. State of Bihar (2017) and Shakti Vahini v.  (2018), the choice of marital partner is an exercise of freedom of expression enshrined in Article 19.

The objection provision of the secular marriage laws authorises any person to object to the marriage notice and enables continuing harassment and persecution. In doing so, it violates the freedom of expression guaranteed by Article 19.

Right to Life and Personal Liberty 
Article 21 of the Indian Constitution and relevant precedents guarantee the right to choose a marital partner.

While deciding on the case of Lata Singh v. State of Uttar Pradesh (2006), Puttaswamy v.  (2017) and Laxmibai Chandaragi B. v. State of Karnataka (2021), the Supreme Court held that the right to marry a person of one’s choice is integral to life protected under Article 21 In the case of Shafin Jahan v Ashokan K.M. (2018), the Supreme Court declared that the right to marry a person of one’s choice is integral to personal liberty protected under Article 21.

In the case of Puttaswamy v.  (2017), the Supreme Court ruled that the right to privacy is an intrinsic part of the right to life and personal liberty. The right to privacy includes the privacy of choice, which protects an individual’s autonomy over fundamental personal choices. While ruling in Navtej Singh Johar v.  (2018) case, the Supreme Court declared that sexual orientation is part of an individual‘s autonomy. It stated that under the autonomy principle, the individual has sovereignty over their body. They can surrender their autonomy wilfully to another individual and their intimacy in privacy is a matter of their choice.

The objection provision of the secular marriage laws authorises any person to object to the marriage notice and infringe on the personal choice of two consenting adults. The notice and objections provisions of the secular marriage laws take marriage out of the private domain by making publication mandatory. The provisions violate the decisional autonomy by authorising any person to object to the marriage notice. The provisions force individuals to surrender their right to privacy to exercise their right to marry. In the Ahmedabad St. Xavier’s College Society v. State of Gujarat case (1974) case, the Supreme Court held that a requirement that forces the individual to give up one constitutional right to exercise another is unconstitutional.

Right to Freedom of Conscience and Religion 
Along with the relevant precedents, Article 25 of the Indian Constitution guarantees the right to choose a marital partner. Since the Supreme Court, in Puttaswamy v.  (2017) case, ruled that the freedom of conscience of an individual is more than religious beliefs, the petitioners argued that the freedom to choose a marital partner is an integral component of freedom of conscience.

The petitioners claiming recognition under the secular marriage laws argued by citing the Indian Young Lawyers Association v. State of Kerala (2019) case, in which the Supreme Court ruled that Article 25 guaranteed freedom of religion and freedom from religion. Therefore, the state cannot endorse the conception of marriage that is exclusively heterosexual, as it is rooted in the norms of religion.

The petitioners claiming recognition under personal laws argued that Hinduism does not prohibit same-sex marriage. By excluding same-sex marriage from the Hindu Marriage Act, the respondents violated the petitioners' right to practice religion freely, as guaranteed by Article 25.

International & Comparative Law

International Treaty 
India is a party to various international treaties concerning human rights. India voted to adopt the Universal Declaration of Human Rights (UDHR) in United Nations General Assembly on 10 December 1948, and the same is enforceable in India under the Protection of Human Rights Act of 1993. India ratified the International Convention of Civil and Political Rights (ICCPR) and the International Covenant on Economic, Social and Cultural Rights (ICESCR) on 10 April 1979.

Since the Supreme Court enforced the international treaties discussed above while ruling in the  v.  (2014) and Navtej Singh Johar v.  (2018), the Petitioners argued for the recognition of same-sex marriage based on the following articles:
 Article 7 of the UDHR, Article 26 of ICCPR and Article 2 of ICESCR prohibit discrimination based on "sex... or other status." The General Comment published by the UN Committee on Economic, Social and Cultural Rights clarified and urged the member states to "ensure that a person's sexual orientation is not a barrier to realising Covenant Rights."
 Article 16 of the UDHR and Article 23 of the ICCPR guarantee the right to marry and establish a family.
 Article 12 of the UDHR and Article 17 of the ICCPR prohibit arbitrary interference with their privacy, family, home or correspondence.

Yogyakarta Principles 
While ruling in the  v.  (2014) and Navtej Singh Johar v.  (2018), the Supreme Court held that Yogyakarta Principles on the Application of Human Rights Law in Relation to Sexual Orientation and Gender Identity (2007) is consistent with various fundamental rights enshrined in the Indian Constitution. They must be recognised and followed.

The petitioners pointed to Principle 24 of the Yogyakarta Principles, which recognises the right to establish a family, regardless of gender identity and sexual orientation. Specifically, the Principle calls for the State to recognise same-sex marriage or registered partnership and ensure that same-sex married or registered partners have the entitlements, privileges, obligations and benefits available to different-sex married or registered partners.

Judicial Comity 
While deciding in the Mirza Ali Akbar Kashani v. United Arab Republic (1966), Tractor Export v. Tarapore & Co. (1969) and Gramophone Company of India Ltd. v. Birendra Bahadur Pandey (1984), the Supreme Court recognised the principles of comity of nations. The Supreme Court, in the case of Apparel Export Promotion Council v. A. K. Chopra (1999), pointed out that domestic courts are obligated to consider international conventions and norms for construing domestic laws, especially when there is no inconsistency between them, and there is a void in domestic law.

Petitioners called attention to the fact that 32 countries have recognised same-sex marriage. Since Foreign Marriage Act has extra-territorial operations, petitioners argued that it should be read to conform with international developments.

Foreign Precedents 
The petitioners discuss the precedents of various supranational and national jurisdictions. The followings is a list of precedents from supranational jurisdictions are: 
 Oliari v. Italy is a decision of European Court of Human Rights, Council of Europe (2015)
 Advisory Opinion of Inter-American Court of Human Rights, Organization of American States (2018)

The followings is a list of precedents from foreign national jurisdictions are:
 Halpern v Canada (AG) is a decision of Court of Appeal for Ontario, Canada (2003)
 Minister of Home Affairs v Fourie is a decision of Constitutional Court, South Africa (2005)
 Obergefell v. Hodges is a decision of Supreme Court, United States (2015)
 Same-sex Marriage Case in Constitutional Court, Taiwan (2017)
 Same-sex Marriage Case in Constitutional Court, Austria (2017)
 Same-sex Marriage Case in Constitutional Court, Ecuador (2019)
 Same-sex Marriage and Adoption Case in Constitutional Court, Slovenia (2022)

National Marriage Laws

Issues in Secular Marriage Law 
The notice and objections provisions detail the requirement for registering a marriage under the secular marriage laws— Special Marriage Act and Foreign Marriage Act. The individuals intending to marry must publish their details in Marriage Notice Book meant for public inspection. Within thirty days of publication, any person can object to their marriage, and a marriage officer, who has the power of a civil court, handles the objections.

The intention of the notice and objections provisions is to address the situations where individuals might hide the breach of prerequisites of marriage. However, such deterrents are absent in the personal laws governing marriage. Evidently, notice and objection provisions are not the only way to address the problem of a breach of prerequisites of marriage. The provisions are grossly disproportionate and violate the right to personal liberty, privacy and freedom of expression. It discriminates those constrained to marry under secular marriage laws from those who marry under personal laws. It creates an unequal burden on individuals who choose to marry under secular marriage laws.

While arguing that the notice and objection provision enables continuing harassment and persecution, petitioners pointed to the 242nd Law Commission report produced by Nineteenth Law Commission. The report, titled Prevention of Interference with the freedom of Matrimonial Alliances, recommends the removal of the notice and objection provisions of the secular marriage laws to prevent “high-handed or unwarranted interference” in marriages.

National Laws & Regulations 
The petitioners highlighted various entitlements, privileges, obligations and benefits available to different-sex couples but not same-sex couples without legal recognition of same-sex marriage.

Healthcare 
When a patient is unable to communicate their wishes due to being in a persistent vegetative state, having a form of dementia or similar illness, or being under anaesthesia, a same-sex partner cannot legally make healthcare decisions for them.

Same-sex couples face discrimination in organ donation in the case of both living or deceased partners. Under the Transplantation of Human Organs and Tissues Act of 1994, the declaration to donate organs requires the presence of at least one "near relative". Legally, "near relative" means a spouse, son, daughter, father, mother, brother or sister. As a result, same-sex couples cannot make these vital decisions about their deceased partner. Same-sex couples need prior approval of the Authorisation Committee under the Transplantation of Human Organs and Tissues Act. The Committee evaluates the proof of affection or attachment to the intended recipient of the organ before permitting organ donation. But married couples do not require prior approval because they are considered "near relatives".

Finance 
Same-sex couples lack the rights around succession, maintenance, joint ownership of assets, taxation and benefits. As private entitlements exclude same-sex couples, same-sex couples face more barriers and higher scrutiny in privately offered life insurance nominations, owning joint bank accounts and lockers, and mutual funds and savings plans.

According to the Income Tax Act of 1961, the payments made on behalf of a spouse are included in the deduction when computing the total income. These deductions include the payments made towards life insurance, a deferred annuity of the life of a spouse, the spouse's provident fund set up by the Central Government and the spouse for participation in the Unit-linked Insurance Plan. Same-sex couples cannot claim such deductions.

According to the Supreme Court ruling on Rajesh v. Rajbir Singh, the spousal consortium considered in the claims, including the claims for injury and death in the Motor Vehicle Act of 1988 cases, is only available to married couples. Hence the petitioners are denied such claims.

Employment 
Without legal recognition of same-sex marriage, same-sex couples cannot access the benefits available to different-sex couples through various legislation. Same-sex couples in government service cannot request same-city postings. A same-sex partner cannot receive the healthcare coverage provided to the spouse of government employees.

The government grants an appointment on compassionate grounds to a dependent family member of a government servant dying or retired on medical grounds and leaving their family without any livelihood. Same-sex partners are not eligible for compassionate appointments or family pensions.

Under the current reading of the Indian Acts, an employee cannot nominate their same-sex partner for benefits and entitlements as long as their family members are alive. Some of the Acts highlighted by the petitioners are:
 Employee's Compensation Act of 1923,
 Employees' Provident Funds Act of 1952,
 Payment of Gratuity Act of 1972,
 Payment of Wages Act, 1936 and
 Unorganised Workers' Social Security Act of 2008.

Since private entitlements, such as healthcare and other spousal benefits extended in private employment, exclude same-sex couples, same-sex couples face more barriers and higher scrutiny in acquiring spousal benefits.

Housing 
Same-sex partners do not have the right to reside in a shared household. Hence, same-sex couples cannot rely on their partner's rented or owned home to prove residence for official purposes.

Parenthood 
Without legal recognition of same-sex marriage, same-sex couples cannot have children through adoption, surrogacy, or assisted reproductive technologies.

The Juvenile Justice Act of 2015, along with relevant rules, does not allow unmarried couples and couples in a live-in relationship to adopt children as a couple. The Adoption Regulations of 2022 state that a child cannot be given in adoption to a couple unless they have at least two years of a stable marital relationship. In line with the Adoption Regulations, the Central Adoption Resource Authority has decided that single prospective adoptive parents, who are in a live-in relationship with a partner, will not be considered eligible to adopt a child.

The Surrogacy (Regulation) Act of 2021 allows only married couples to have children through surrogacy. The Assisted Reproductive Technology (Regulation) Act of 2021 allows only infertile married couples to obtain the services of an authorised clinic or bank for assisted reproductive technologies.

Judicial Proceedings 
The Indian Evidence Act of 1872 provides spousal privilege, that is, immunity from being compelled to disclose any communication between spouses during their marriage. Additionally, they cannot disclose any communication without their partner or partner's representative's consent. Same-sex couples do not have this crucial protection privilege under Indian evidentiary law.

The Protection of Women from Domestic Violence Act of 2005 protects women in an different-sex marital or live-in relationship. The law extends its protection to women living in a household, such as sisters or mothers, but fails to protect women in a same-sex relationship.

Entry & Residency Permits 
A spouse of foreign origin of an Indian Citizen or OCI is entitled to apply for registration as an OCI under the Citizenship Act. OCI is a form of permanent residency which allows cardholders to live and work in India indefinitely. Without legal recognition of same-sex marriage, a same-sex spouse of foreign origin is not eligible for OCI Card.

Same-sex marriage recognition is crucial for acquiring a visa and residency. Same-sex couples cannot declare the name of their partner in their passport. Similarly, OCI cardholders are subject to the notification issued by the Union Government— for example, during the COVID-19 pandemic, the Union Government allowed OCI cardholders with Indian parents or spouses alone to enter the country.

Social Exclusion & Violence 
Legally sanctioned exclusion, such as the prohibition of same-sex marriage, constitutes a form of structural discrimination which reinforces ignorance and prejudice and leads to widespread discrimination, rejection and violence against queer Indians.

Prevalence of Social Exclusion & Violence 
The petitioners demonstrate widespread discrimination, rejection and violence against queer Indians by reporting relevant peer-reviewed studies and news articles.

Family honour culture is one of the reasons for the harassment of queer Indians. A 2021 multinational study documented the attitudes towards violence against queer people in five countries: India, Pakistan, Malaysia, Iran and England. Indians ranked second, following Pakistanis, for their belief that gay men had damaged their family honour and their acceptance of verbal abuse and life-threatening violence by the family towards gay men. The family honour culture contributes to the forced different-sex marriage of queer individuals. 

Familial harassment and rejection are common reasons for homelessness and suicide among queer Indians. India lacks comprehensive statistics on these issues. A 2011 Mumbai-based study of men who have sex with men found 45 per cent to be suicidal, with 15 per cent categorised as high risk. A 2016 Indian study estimated the suicide rate among transgender Indians as 31 per cent, and at least 50 per cent of them have attempted suicide at least once before their 20th birthday. Reports have documented instances where lesbian couples have considered, attempted or committed suicide together. A lesbian couple, Asha Thakor and Bhavna Thakor, facing opposition from their family in rural Gujarat, committed suicide shortly after eloping to the city. The couple had eloped to find a safe space and acceptance but never found it. Similarly, a gay couple from rural Assam, Ankur Das and Brajen Thakuria committed suicide after their families firmly opposed their relationship and blamed them for one of their mother's early death. Despite the existence of suicide notes and social media posts, most of the cases end with first information reports and news articles, without any investigations and persecution of those abetting suicide.

The fear of familial harassment and rejection causes queer Indians to conceal their identity and remain in the closet. However, this does not guarantee their safety. According to a 2015 Indian survey, the majority of gay men who experienced physical violence (52.4%), sexual abuse (55%) and psychological abuse (46.5%) lived with their parents and were most often closeted. In contrast, gay men who lived with their partners or queer Indians faced little abuse. Closeted gay men living with parents cannot freely seek peer support from other queer people when faced with violence.

In the larger society, queer Indians face prejudice in housing, education and employment. Queer Indians encounter discrimination from property owners and landlords, leading to a denial of housing and forced evictions. A 2018 UNESCO-supported Indian study found that 60% of middle school students (ISCED Level 2),  60% of high school students (ISCED Level 3) and 50% of higher secondary school students (ISCED Level 3) were victims of physical violence due to gender identity and sexual orientation. As a result of the harassment, the students reported they had reduced social interaction with their peers (73%), suffered from anxiety and depression (70%), and discontinued school (33.2%). Prejudice in the workplace manifests as harassment and discrimination in the recruitment process and promotions.

Subsequently, most queer Indians grow old facing life without lawful companionship and confronting the reality of loneliness, which research shows carry a risk comparable to if not exceeds, that of other well-accepted factors, including smoking up to 15 cigarettes a day, obesity, physical inactivity and air pollution.

Social Assimilation through Inclusive Policies 
In light of widespread discrimination, rejection and violence against queer Indians, the petitioners argued the queer-inclusive policies — for relationships, parenthood, healthcare, education and employment — provides opportunities to assimilate into society To make their case, the petitioners highlighted the historical role of Indian statutory reforms, such as the abolishment of Sati and recognition of inter-caste marriage and widow remarriage, in aiding the social assimilation of marginalised Indians.

Scholars reason that the legal recognition of same-sex marriage is often accompanied by media attention and increased visibility, which is associated with increased social support for queer people. The increased social support could translate into improved familial and peer acceptance, which is associated with improved mental health. A 2017 U.S. study found queer teens' suicide attempts declined in U.S. states that enacted laws recognising same-sex marriage. The study also reported the effect of legal recognition of same-sex marriage persisted two years after recognition, disproving the argument that legal recognition of same-sex marriage would negatively affect queer people due to social and political backlash. More directly, the legal recognition of same-sex marriage would extend the previously discussed benefits, entitlements, privileges and obligations to same-sex couples and improve their quality of life.

Economic Cost of Social Exclusion 
The petitioners argued that the structural discrimination against queer Indians, such as the prohibition of same-sex marriage, hurts economic output— an unnecessary cost to all Indian citizens. Cross-country studies have estimated that the legal provision of marriage equality is associated with a long-term increase in GDP per capita of 54 to 64 per cent.

Work Environment 
Discrimination in the workplace leads to underutilisation of human capital if a less skilled worker from favoured groups is hired or promoted instead of a skilled queer worker. If the skilled queer workers cannot find a suitable option, then the unutilised or underutilised skilled queer workers constitute a loss to economic output.

In addition to discrimination, the harassment of queer workers can reduce their productivity, even if their wages and employment are not directly affected. A 2016 study found that 40 per cent of queer workers experienced harassment by their peers, and 66 per cent heard anti-queer comments. A 2019 study found that queer workers are 10 per cent less productive in the same job as the general population, leading to a loss of 0.4 per cent of GDP annually.

Several studies found a positive association between queer-friendly policies and financial measures like stock prices, asset returns, per-worker output and employee innovation. It is not a coincidence that 91 per cent of Fortune 500 companies included sexual orientation in their non-discrimination policies in 2019.

Emigration 
When denied equal rights, queer Indians who can migrate, often highly educated or financially resourceful individuals, migrate to countries that afford better protection. Sexual Migration— migration where sexual orientation is an influential factor— is a well-documented and widespread phenomenon. Studies focusing on Indian migrants have documented the lack of queer rights in India as a motivating factor for the decision. Due to the lack of Indian studies on sexual migration, the petitioners pointed to the Hong Kong study, which reported that 52.5 per cent considered leaving because of their sexual orientation, of whom 91.3 per cent cited the lack of marriage equality as a reason.

Foreign Revenue 
Research shows a positive correlation between acceptance of homosexuality and foreign investments. When comparing cities, there is a positive association between homosexual residents, foreign-born residents and the number of successful businesses. Additionally, queer tourism was worth 211 billion dollars in 2016. Queer travellers tend to spend more than cisgendered heterosexual travellers, but they are unlikely to choose destinations which lack adequate protections for queer people.

Health Disparity 
The studies show the stigma and social exclusion experienced by queer Indians lead to higher incidences of physical and mental health problems among queer Indians compared to the general population drastically reducing their ability to engage in productive work and contribute to overall economic activity. Canadian and US studies on the cost of stigma and social exclusion have used data on depression, suicide, smoking, alcohol abuse, substance abuse, HIV, hospitalisation, lost days of work, and early mortality. Since India lacks such comprehensive data on the health disparity of queer Indians, the 2014 World Bank study considered only depression, suicide and HIV among queer Indians. The study estimates stigma and social exclusion of queer Indians cost India up to 1.3 per cent of its GDP annually.

Researchers’ preferred explanation for the higher incidences of mental health problems among queer people is that stigma, prejudice, and discrimination create a stressful social environment that can lead to these problems. Rates of depression among queer Indians are 6 to 12 times higher than the general population. A Mumbai-based study of men who have sex with men found 45 per cent to be suicidal, with 15 per cent categorised as high risk. This range of suicidal ideation among queer Indians is 7 to 14 times the suicidal ideation among the general population from developing countries, including India.

Social exclusion might make healthcare services less relevant or accessible to queer Indians. A study found that prejudice in society, specifically among healthcare providers, and experiencing negative consequences when disclosing their identity was associated with lower access to HIV preventive measures among queer people. The rate of HIV among Indians is 0.35 per cent, whereas the rate for queer Indians is 5.7 per cent.

The Respondent 
On 12th March 2023, the Union Government under the Bharatiya Janata Party leadership filed a counter-affidavit in the Supreme Court, opposing legal recognition of same-sex marriage. This section contains a summary of relevant precedents, issues and laws submitted.

Judicial Overreach 
The Union Government argued that the legislative intent, limiting the legal recognition of marriage and benefits associated with such legal recognition, cannot be subjected to judicial review. Recognising human relations and conferring rights has consequences in law and privileges and is, in essence, a legislative function and can never be the subject matter of judicial adjudication. Therefore, the petition before the Supreme Court is wholly unsustainable, untenable and misplaced.

Fundamental Rights 
The Union Government argued that the non-recognition of same-sex marriage does not violate the fundamental rights guaranteed under Articles 14, 15, 19, 21 and 25 of the Indian Constitution. While reading down Section 377 of the Indian Penal Code for violating fundamental rights in the Navtej Singh Johar v. UOI (2018) case, the Supreme Court differentiated same-sex relations from same-sex marriage.

Right to Equality 
Normativity is an intelligible differentia which distinguishes different-sex couples from same-sex couples. The rationale for this classification is to ensure social stability through legal recognition of marriage. Hence the non-recognition of same-sex marriage does not violate Article 14 of the Indian Constitution, which guarantees equality before the law or equal protection of the laws within the territory of India.

Protection from Discrimination 
Different-sex couples living together do not enjoy the same status as different-sex married couples. While ruling in the case of Badri Prasad v. Director of Consolidation (1978), the Supreme Court held the presumption of the marriage of couples living together is rebuttable. Not every form of different-sex relationship is on par with different-sex marriage. Since the non-recognition of same-sex marriage is not discrimination only based on sex, it does not violate Article 15 of the Indian Constitution.

Right to Freedom 
While all citizens have a right to an association under Article 19 of the Indian Constitution, the State is not obligated to recognise such associations.

Right to Life and Personal Liberty 
The respondents argued against the reading of Article 21 of the Indian Constitution to include any implicit approval of same-sex marriage. The respondents pointed to the ruling in Navtej Singh Johar v. UOI (2018) case, where the Supreme Court explicitly clarified that the right to a union does not mean the union of marriage.

The right to privacy is intrinsic to Article 21 of the Indian Constitution. The marriage is between two private individuals with a profound impact on their personal lives. However, when considering legal recognition of their marriage and ancillary rights, the Judiciary cannot relegate marriage as a concept within the private domain.

Statutory 
Legal recognition of same-sex marriage will make legislations governing marriage and ancillary rights obtuse. The following is a list of legislations that would be affected if the Supreme Court ruled recognised same-sex marriage:

Preliminary Hearing

25 November 2022 
A 2-judge bench, consisting of Chief Justice DY Chandrachud and Justice Hima Kohli, heard two similar petitions and agreed to proceed with the case. The Bench sought a response from the Union Government.

3 January 2023 
The advocates representing the petitioners urged a 2-judge bench, consisting of CJI DY Chandrachud and Justices PS Narasimha, to transfer similar petitions pending in high courts to Supreme Court. The Bench agreed to list the transfer petitions along with the main petition on January 6th, 2023.

6 January 2023 
A 3-judge bench, consisting of CJI DY Chandrachud and Justices PS Narasimha and JB Pardiwala, heard four new petitions and admitted them to join the case. The Bench directed high courts to transfer nine similar petitions— eight from Delhi High Court and one from Kerala High Court to itself.

30 January 2023 
The 3-judge Bench heard a petition from Kajal and Bhawna and admitted them to join the case.

10 February 2023 
The 3-judge Bench heard a petition from Amburi Roy and Aparna Saha and admitted them to join the case.

20 February 2023 
The 3-judge Bench heard a petition from Akkai Padmashali, Vyjayanti Vasanta Mogli and Umesh P and admitted them to join the case.

3 March 2023 
The 3-judge Bench heard a petition from ten petitioners, including Rituparna Borah, Chayanika Shah, Minakshi Sanyal and Maya Sharma, and admitted them to join the case.

13 March 2023 
Solicitor General filed the government's response, arguing the petition as wholly unsustainable, untenable and misplaced and urging the 3-judge Bench to dismiss the petition. Considering the case involved constitutional and statutory questions of law, the Bench invoked Article 145(3) and referred it to the 5-judge Constitutional Bench.

Oral Arguments 
The oral arguments are set to begin on 18th April  2023.

Public Opinion 
According to a 2019 multinational survey, 37 per cent of Indians said that society should accept homosexuality, a 22-point increase from the 15 per cent of Indians who said the same before decriminalisation of homosexuality. India and South Africa had the biggest change among the 34 countries studied.

Marriage 
A 2021 multinational survey found that 44 per cent of Indians supported same-sex marriage, 18 per cent opposed same-sex marriage, and 14 per cent supported civil partnership but not marriage. Moreover, 56 per cent of Indians said their view had changed in the last five years. 

A 2019 Indian survey found that 62 per cent of Indians opposed same-sex marriage, and 24 per cent supported it.

Adoption 
A multinational survey found that 66 per cent of Indians supported same-sex couples' right to adopt, and 21 per cent opposed it. Also, 59 per cent of Indians believed same-sex couples could be equally successful in raising children, and 26 per cent disagreed.

Reaction

Community Organisations

Namma Pride 
Bangalore-based queer organization Namma Pride released an open letter critiquing the Union Government for disregarding its constitutional commitment to securing the right of queer citizens and perpetuating discriminatory marriage laws. The letter challenged the legal arguments of the Union Government in the affidavit filed on 12th March 2023.

Queerythm 
Prijith P K, president of Thiruvananthapuram-based queer organization Queerythm, accused Bharatiya Janata Party of filing a ‘homophobic’ counter-affidavit to cater to the social conservative voters for the upcoming elections at the cost of queer rights.

Political Parties

Bharatiya Janata Party 
BJP is a right-wing national party. On 12th March 2023, the Union Government under the BJP leadership opposed legal recognition of same-sex marriage in the Supreme Court.

On 19 December 2022, BJP Member of the Council of States Sushil Kumar Modi expressed his opposition to the Judicial Review of the Indian marriage laws. He told the Parliament, "India is a country of 1.4 billion people, and two judges cannot just sit in a room and decide on such a socially significant subject. Instead, there should be a debate in Parliament as well as the society at large".

Indian National Congress 
Congress is a centre-to-centre-left national party. As some senior leaders dismissed same-sex marriage as an unimportant or alien issue for Congress to take an official position, and others shared only their personal views, Congress does not have an official stance on same-sex marriage.

Congress Member of the Council of States Abhishek Singhvi, who is a lead counsel for one of the petitioners, argued for judicial intervention. He said that the questions about the possible legislative approach are meaningless as the BJP-led Union Government "vociferously opposed same-sex marriage".

Congress Member of the House of the People Shashi Tharoor said denying civil rights to same-sex partners is wrong and unjustifiable and should be remedied without delay. Noting the resistance from the majority, he suggested a two-stage process where the first step is a civil partnership, a contract that grants the legal rights of spouses to same-sex partners. After seeing the impact on Indian society, the Union Government might recognise same-sex marriage. 

Congress Member of the House of the People Manish Tewari said that following the decriminalisation of same-sex relations by the 5-judge Constitution Bench of the Supreme Court, legalisation of such relationships should be a natural corollary.

Communist Party of India (Marxist) 
CPI(M) is a left-wing national party. Member of the Politburo Brinda Karat said CPI(M) supports the rights of same-sex partners to get legal recognition of their relationship as a marriage. She called for judicial intervention, as the BJP-led Union Government opposed same-sex marriage.

Prominent Individuals

Ruth Vanita 
Indian feminist critic and literary historian Ruth Vanita pointed out that Indian opponents arguing that same-sex marriage is against the Indian culture are ironically borrowing the argument from the West, which had earlier debated that same-sex marriage is against Western culture. As Indian opponents raised the alarm that same-sex marriage would cause social havoc, she drew attention to the 31 countries that have recognised same-sex marriage and did not experience “social havoc”.

Religious Organisation

Hinduism

Rashtriya Swayamsevak Sangh 
RSS is a Hindu nationalist organisation and the ideological parent of Prime Minister Modi's Bharatiya Janata Party. On 14th March 2023, during the press conference at the end of Akhil Bharatiya Pratinidhi Sabha, RSS General Secretary Dattatreya Hosabale backed the BJP-led Union Government's opposition to same-sex marriage. He said marriage is an institution for the benefit of the family and society, not for physical and sexual enjoyment.

United Hindu Front 
On 6th January 2023, socially conservative Hindu organisation United Hindu Front protested outside the court, decrying homosexuality as against Indian culture and insisting the Supreme Court should not hear the petitions. However, the Supreme Court continued with the hearing.

Islam

All India Muslim Personal Law Board 
Muslim Personal Law Board is a socially conservative Islamic organisation working to protect Muslim personal laws. Muslim Personal Law Board General Secretary Khalid Saifullah Rahmani released a statement supporting the Union Government's opposition to same-sex marriage and stated that Muslim Personal Law Board would try to become a party to the case if necessary. The statement said that the act of homosexuality and same-sex marriage is contrary to religion, moral values, and social traditions and is unacceptable, illegal and a crime.

Jamaat-e-Islami Hind 
Mohammad Salim, Vice President of the socially conservative Islamic organisation JIH, backed the Union Government's opposition to same-sex marriage. He said that JIH believes in fundamental rights and advocates for freedom and minority rights. However, freedom comes with moral responsibility, and no society can accept crimes, vices and anarchy in the name of freedom and personal liberty.

See also 
 LGBT rights in India
 Devu G v. State of Kerala (2023)
 Arun Kumar v. Inspector General of Registration (2019)
 Navtej Singh Johar v. Union of India (2018)

References 

Indian LGBT rights case law
2023 in case law
2023 in India
2023 in LGBT history
Same-sex marriage in Asia
Supreme Court of India cases
Supreme Court of India
Marriage law in India